The 2002 Armenian First League is the 12th season of the Armenian First League. It started on the 25th of April and ended November 17. FC Armavir from Armavir became the league champions, and were promoted to the 2003 Armenian Premier League.

Overview
 Newly created FC Lokomotiv Yerevan, FC Dinamo Yeghvard, Nork Marash FC, Pyunik-3, Lernayin Artsakh-2 Yerevan, Spartak-2 Yerevan, Shirak-2, Mika-2, and Dinamo 2000-2 are introduced to the league.
 Araks Ararat FC, Arpa FC, Kilikia FC, and FC Vanadzor returned to professional football. 
 Karmrakhayt changed their name back to FC Armavir.

Participating clubs

League table

Top goalscorers

See also
 2002 Armenian Premier League
 2002 Armenian Cup
 2002 in Armenian football

References

External links
 RSSSF: Armenia 2002 - Second Level

 

Armenian First League seasons
2
Armenia